Pieces of Eighty-Eight is the second and final album by American jazz pianist Evans Bradshaw featuring tracks recorded in 1959 for the Riverside label.

Reception

Allmusic awarded the album 3 stars.

Track listing
 "The Trolley Song" (Ralph Blane, Hugh Martin) – 5:34  
 "Mangos" (Dale Libby, Sid Wayne) – 4:53  
 "Pushing the Blues" (Evans Bradshaw) – 2:53  
 "It Ain't Necessarily So"(George Gershwin, Ira Gershwin) – 5:01  
 "Take the "A" Train" (Billy Strayhorn) – 3:30  
 "A Foggy Day" (Gershwin, Gershwin) – 6:22  
 "It's All Right With Me" (Cole Porter) – 5:14  
 "Blues for Jim" (Bradshaw) – 6:41  
 "A Night in Tunisia" (Dizzy Gillespie, Frank Paparelli) – 2:33

Personnel 
Evans Bradshaw - piano
Alvin Jackson - bass
Richard Allen - drums

References 

1959 albums
Evans Bradshaw albums
Albums produced by Orrin Keepnews
Riverside Records albums